Calamae or Kalamai was a village of ancient Messenia, near Limnae, and at no great distance from the frontiers of Laconia.

Its site is located near the modern Εlaiochori.

References

Populated places in ancient Messenia
Former populated places in Greece